J-Pilot is an open-source GTK+-based desktop organizer for Unix-like systems written by Judd Montgomery, designed to work with Palm OS-based handheld PDAs. It uses the pilot-link libraries to communicate with Palm devices. It is released under the GNU GPL, version 2.

Linux support
Palm does not provide a version of the software for Linux operating system, nor do they officially support the ones developed by third parties such as J-Pilot or Gnome-Pilot.

Features
Third-party Application Support
Plugin Support
Import and Export Features
Supports Palm Application Features
Supports Datebook, Address, To Do List, and Memo Pad
Supports the newer Contacts and Memos (Calendar and Tasks not yet)

Installation instructions 
Installation instructions are available in the README.md file, in the J-Pilot source code repository.

See also
KPilot
Palm Desktop
Gnome-Pilot
ColdSync
PilotManager

References

Free software